A list of Hong Kong films released in 2016:

See also
 2016 in Hong Kong

References

External links
 IMDB list of Hong Kong films 
 Hong Kong films of 2016 at HKcinemamagic.com

2016
Films
Hong Kong